Deathmarch is the fourth EP by Swedish black metal band Marduk. It features an alternative cut, a b-side, and two rehearsal takes of songs from Marduk's ninth studio album, Plague Angel, released a month prior. Deathmarch is titled after a song of the same name which also  appeared on Plague Angel, although the song does not appear on this EP.

Track listing

Personnel
Marduk
 Mortuus – vocals
 Morgan Steinmeyer Håkansson – guitar
 Magnus Devo Andersson – bass, mixing
 Emil Dragutinovic  – drums

2004 EPs
Marduk (band) EPs